Nigga is a colloquial and vulgar term used in African-American Vernacular English that began as a dialect form of the word nigger, an ethnic slur against black people. The word is commonly associated with hip hop music and African-American gang culture. In dialects of English (including standard British English) that have non-rhotic speech, nigger and nigga are often pronounced the same.

Usage 
The use of nigger non-pejoratively within the black community was documented in the 1912 novel The Autobiography of an Ex-Colored Man by James Weldon Johnson, in which he recounted a scene in New York City around the turn of the century:
I noticed that among this class of colored men the word "nigger" was freely used in about the same sense as the word "fellow," and sometimes as a term of almost endearment; but I soon learned that its use was positively and absolutely prohibited to white men.

There is conflicting popular opinion on whether there is any meaningful difference between nigga and nigger as a spoken term. Many people consider the terms to be equally pejorative, and the use of nigga both in and outside black communities remains controversial. H. Lewis Smith, author of Bury That Sucka: A Scandalous Love Affair with the N-word, believes that "replacing the 'er' with an 'a' changes nothing other than the pronunciation" and the African American Registry notes, "Brother (Brotha) and Sister (Sistah or Sista) are terms of endearment. Nigger was and still is a word of disrespect." The National Association for the Advancement of Colored People, a civil rights group, condemns use of both nigga and nigger.

Some African-Americans only consider nigga offensive when used by people of other races, seeing its use outside a defined social group as an unwelcome cultural appropriation. Used by black people, the term may indicate "solidarity or affection", similar to the usage of the words dude, homeboy, and bro. Others consider nigga non-offensive except when directed from a non-African-American towards an African-American. Yet others have derided this as hypocritical and harmful, enabling white racists to use the word and confusing the issue over nigger. Conversely, nigga has been used an example of cultural assimilation, whereby members of other ethnicities (particularly younger people) will use the word in a positive way, similar to the previously mentioned bro or dude.

In practice, its use and meaning are heavily dependent on context, with non-offensive examples ranging from a greeting, to reprimand, to general reference, to a use synonymous with male person. , the word nigga was used more liberally among younger members of all races and ethnicities in the United States. In addition to African-Americans, other ethnic groups have adopted the term as part of their vernacular, although this usage is very controversial.

Cultural influence 
The phrase nigga, please, used in the 1970s by comics such as Paul Mooney as "a funny punctuation in jokes about Blacks", is now heard routinely in comedy routines by African-Americans. The growing use of the term is often attributed to its ubiquity in modern American hip hop music.

One of the earliest uses of the term in a popular song was in the lyrics of the 1983 song "New York New York" by Grandmaster Flash and the Furious Five, although it had featured in some very early hip hop recordings such as "Scoopy Rap" and "Family Rap", both from 1979. Ol' Dirty Bastard uses the term 76 times in his Nigga Please album (not including repetitions in choruses).

Comedian Chris Rock's 1996 routine "Niggas vs. Black People" distinguishes a "nigga", which he defined as a "low-expectation-having motherfucker", from a "black person". In contrast, Tupac Shakur distinguished between nigger and nigga: "Niggers was the ones on the rope, hanging off the thing; niggas is the ones with gold ropes, hanging out at clubs." Tupac, who has been credited with legitimizing the term, said his song "N.I.G.G.A." stood for "Never Ignorant Getting Goals Accomplished".

In 2001, a public disagreement between Conrad Tillard (activist and minister then, Conrad Muhammad) and Russell Simmons (Def Jam co-founder) erupted about the portrayal in media of hip hop culture, especially that of rap music. Tillard argued that the use of bitch and nigga by rappers is "degrad[ing] the African-American community" through its "bombardment of ... negative images". He directly accused Simmons of "condoning violence by refusing to condemn the frequent use of [these words] in rap lyrics" in the lead up to both parties organizing gatherings to discuss hip hop culture. Rapper KRS-One publicly supported Tillard, but stated that "if an artist feels he has to use the 'n' or 'b' words, that's a poetic debate. What we're saying is you cannot package the word muthaf---er to our children."[censoring quoted] Tillard's own Campaign for Dignity Meeting in April was boycotted by Simmons, who also encouraged others to not attend, while Simmons organized the Hip Hop Summit in June, which Tillard attended. The disagreement has been referred to as a "feud", and the two were successfully encouraged by Louis Farrakhan (head of the Nation of Islam) at Simmons' summit to bury the hatchet and show public unity.

The song "R & B" from Devin the Dude's second solo album Just Tryin' ta Live (2002) features a comedic conversation between Devin and "a redneck" (voiced by Devin) exploring a cultural divide and how it might be overcome by the liberal application of "reefer and beer". The song culminates with Devin frustrated by the redneck failing to correctly pronounce nigga.

In the 2004 Coen brothers film The Ladykillers, the antagonist is Marva Munson (Irma P. Hall), an elderly church-going landlady with moral certainty living in the Baptist bible belt, who is introduced making a complaint to her local sheriff about her neighbour playing "hippity hop music too loud". She qualifies her disdain by asking the sheriff rhetorically if he knows "what they call colored folks in them songs?" moving to quickly exclaim, "Niggaz" [or "Niggers"; sources have printed both spellings].

Some television shows use the word, either to create a realistic atmosphere or as a way of presenting social discussion, specifically ones relating to the wealth gap between the rich and the poor. The word continues to be used for comedic effect, e.g. it is used commonly in The Boondocks, an adult animated series with satirical takes on traditional American sitcoms and African-American culture.

Use in trademarks or brand names 
Until a 2017 ruling by the U.S. Supreme Court in Matal v. Tam, the Lanham Act did not permit registration of trademarks containing terms that may disparage persons or bring them into disrepute. Registration by the U.S. Patent and Trademark Office (PTO) of terms that are historically considered disparaging to groups of people has been allowed in some circumstances. Self-disparaging trademarks have been allowed in some cases where the applicant has shown that the mark as-used is not considered by the relevant group to be disparaging.

In 1995, two men from Houston filed a trademark application with the PTO for the words "Naturally Intelligent God Gifted Africans", and its acronym. The application was rejected, as were numerous subsequent applications for variations of the word nigga. In 2005, comedian Damon Wayans twice attempted to trademark a brand name called Nigga, "featuring clothing, books, music and general merchandise". The PTO refused Wayans’ application, stating "the very fact that debate is ongoing regarding in-[ethnic]-group usage, shows that a substantial composite of African-Americans find the term 'nigga' to be offensive".

See also

Notes

References

External links 

"Let's Make a Deal on the N-Word: White folks will stop using it, and black folks will stop pretending that quoting it is saying it," John McWhorter, The Root

African-American culture
American slang
English words
English profanity
Hip hop phrases
African-American slang